More Than Just a Dream is the second studio album by American band Fitz and the Tantrums, released on May 7, 2013, by Elektra Records. The album was produced by Tony Hoffer (Beck, M83, Depeche Mode, Phoenix) at The Sound Factory in Los Angeles. The title comes from a line of the chorus from the group's lead single "Out of My League". Their song also featured as soundtrack in EA Sports game, FIFA 13 with "Spark".

The album is their first release for Elektra Records. The band signed with the label's current president Jeff Castelaz, who initially signed the band to their original deal at Dangerbird Records, which Castelaz co-founded in 2004.

Critical reception

More Than Just a Dream has received generally positive reception by the music critics. At Metacritic, they assign a "weighted average" score to ratings and reviews from selected mainstream critics, and the album has a Metascore of 64/100, based on 12 reviews.

AllMusic's Matt Collar found this to be "an even more infectious, club-ready album" than its predecessor, and at the same time "still retaining all of the band's organic soulfulness." At Paste, Ryan Reed proclaimed that the album "is poised for prime time, a diabetic coma of sugar-rush pop." Beth Kellmurray of diffuser.fm told that "by diversifying their approach, Fitz creates a sound that doesn’t get dulled or play like a mere gimmick", and this is the reason she felt that the release "proves the group can find longevity in their eclectic sound." At Glide Magazine, Jeremy Lukens wrote that "it wouldn't be accurate to label More Than Just a Dream a fun but hollow party album, though." Bryan Bierman of The A.V. Club alluded to how the album "is a leap for the band sonically" that "still manages to be entertaining." At Los Angeles Times, Randall Roberts evoked that "there's a fine line between evolution and de-evolution, and which process Fitz and the Tantrums is experiencing on its sophomore effort", and this all relies "on what you liked about the L.A. band's breakout debut."

However, PopMatters' AJ Ramirez found that "it’s an album that’s hard to love, yet easy to like." At Rolling Stone, Jody Rosen told that "the pleasures of the songcraft don't quite compensate for dopey lyrics, the bland vocals of Fitz and co-lead singer Noelle Scaggs, and the relentless spazzing-out." Hal Horowitz of American Songwriter affirmed that "while there is no lack of energy in the performances, many songs seem forced and lack the organic groove that effective soul music demands." At Spin, Michaelangelo Matos felt that the album is "steps backwards [...] where its predecessor was shockingly felt, this settles for something more distant, theatrical, grandiose." The lone negative review came in from Alternative Press and Scott Heisel, and he criticized it with writing that "this is the most boring Hall & Oates record ever."

Track listing

Personnel

Fitz and the Tantrums
Michael Fitzpatrick – vocals, keyboards,  production, engineering
Noelle Scaggs – vocals, percussion 
James King – saxophone, flute, guitar
Joseph Karnes – bass guitar
Jeremy Ruzumna – keyboards
John Wicks – drums, percussion

Production
Tony Hoffer – producer, guitar, programming, additional synths
Todd Burke – recording engineer, mixing
Neal Avron – mixing ("Fool's Gold")
Dave Cooley – mastering

Charts

Release history

References

Fitz and The Tantrums albums
Elektra Records albums
2013 albums
Albums produced by Tony Hoffer